Beta is an unincorporated community in Jackson County, North Carolina, United States. Beta is located along U.S. Route 74, west of Addie and east of Sylva.

When Jackson County was formed in 1851, the home of Dan Bryson, located in Beta, served as the first courthouse.

References

External links
USGS: Beta
Travel Western North Carolina: Beta, WCU Digital Collections
Jackson County Chamber of Commerce

Unincorporated communities in Jackson County, North Carolina
Unincorporated communities in North Carolina
Communities of the Great Smoky Mountains